Norman James Macdonald Lockhart (10 April 1884 – 30 August 1974) was a Canadian businessman and politician. Lockhart was a Conservative and Progressive Conservative party member of the House of Commons of Canada.

Biography
Lockhart was born in Dunnville, Ontario and became a merchant by career.

The son of Norman Macdonald Lockhart and Charlotte Jane Blott, Lockhart attended public and high schools in Dunnville. He was a retailer of fuel and building supplies. He served on the St. Catharines, Ontario board of education from 1923 to 1934, and became the community's mayor in 1935.

He was first elected to Parliament at the Lincoln riding in the 1935 general election under the Conservative party banner and re-elected there in 1940 and 1945, during which time his party became known as the Progressive Conservatives. Lockhart did not stand for another term in office in the 1949 election.

References

External links
 

1884 births
1974 deaths
Canadian merchants
Conservative Party of Canada (1867–1942) MPs
Mayors of St. Catharines
Members of the House of Commons of Canada from Ontario
Progressive Conservative Party of Canada MPs